Albert Allick "Al" Bowlly (7 January 1898 – 17 April 1941) was a Mozambican-born South African/British singer, songwriter, composer and band leader, who became a popular jazz crooner during the British dance band era of the 1930s and later worked in the United States. He recorded more than 1,000 records between 1927 and 1941. His most popular songs include "Midnight, the Stars and You", "Goodnight, Sweetheart", "The Very Thought of You", "Guilty" and "Love Is the Sweetest Thing".

Discography of 78 rpm singles

References

Discographies of Mozambican artists
Discographies of British artists
Discographies of South African artists